Whitehouse may refer to:

People 

 Charles S. Whitehouse (1921-2001), American diplomat
 Cornelius Whitehouse (1796–1883), English engineer and inventor
E. Sheldon Whitehouse (1883-1965), American diplomat
 Elliott Whitehouse (born 1993), English footballer
 Eula Whitehouse (1892–1974), American botanist
 Frederick William Whitehouse (1900–1973), Australian geologist
 Jimmy Whitehouse (footballer, born 1924) (1924-2005), English footballer 
 Mary Whitehouse (1910–2001), British Christian morality campaigner
 Morris H. Whitehouse (1878–1944), American architect
 Paul Whitehouse (born 1958), Welsh comedian and actor
 Paul Whitehouse (police officer) (born 1944)
 Sheldon Whitehouse (born 1955), American politician from the state of Rhode Island
 Wildman Whitehouse (1816–1890), English surgeon and chief electrician for the transatlantic telegraph cable

Places 

in the United Kingdom
 Whitehouse, Aberdeenshire, location of the Whitehouse railway station on the Alford Valley Railway in Aberdeenshire, Scotland
 Whitehouse, Argyll, a hamlet on the Kintyre peninsula of Argyll and Bute, Scotland
 Whitehouse, Ipswich, a ward in Ipswich, England
 Whitehouse, Milton Keynes, a civil parish in Milton Keynes, England

in the United States
 Whitehouse, a neighborhood of Jacksonville, Florida
 Whitehouse, Georgia, an unincorporated community
 Whitehouse, New Jersey, a village in Readington, New Jersey
 Whitehouse, Ohio, a village in Ohio
 Whitehouse, Texas, a city in Texas

Other 
 B.B. Whitehouse, organ manufacturer in Brisbane, Australia
 Whitehouse (magazine), a British pornographic magazine first published in 1974
 Whitehouse (band), English power electronics band named after Mary Whitehouse
 Whitehouse Institute of Design, an Australian art and design school
 The Whitehouse (pub), a Grade II Listed public house in Liverpool
 Whitehouse station (disambiguation), stations of the name

Web sites
 WhiteHouse.gov, official White House website launched in 1994
 Whitehouse.com, former adult entertainment website
 Whitehouse.org, a parody website that Chickenhead Productions created in 2001

See also
 White House, the residence of the president of the United States
 White House (disambiguation) 
 
 

English-language surnames